Symmoca orphnella is a moth of the family Autostichidae. It is found in France, Italy and Spain.

The wingspan is 9–10 mm. The wings are dusted with brownish grey. The hindwings are somewhat darker.

References

Moths described in 1893
Symmoca
Moths of Europe